Oleh Stanislavovych Kiryukhin (born January 1, 1975, in Mariupol) is a Ukrainian boxer, who won the light flyweight bronze medal at the 1996 Summer Olympics.

Olympic results
Defeated Abdul Rashid Qambrani (Pakistan) 17-3
Defeated Beibis Mendoza (Colombia) 18-6
Defeated Albert Guardado (United States) 19-14
Lost to Daniel Petrov (Bulgaria) 8-17

Pro career
Kiryukin began his professional career in 2000 and had limited success, retiring in 2001 with a record of 5-1-0.

External links
 

1975 births
Living people
Sportspeople from Mariupol
Olympic boxers of Ukraine
Boxers at the 1996 Summer Olympics
Olympic bronze medalists for Ukraine
Olympic medalists in boxing
Ukrainian male boxers
Medalists at the 1996 Summer Olympics
Light-flyweight boxers